George Lawley (10 April 1903 – 7 April 1987) was an English professional footballer who played as a winger for Sunderland.

References

1903 births
1987 deaths
Footballers from Wolverhampton
English footballers
Association football wingers
Darlaston Town F.C. players
Bloxwich Strollers F.C. players
Walsall F.C. players
Burton Town F.C. players
Merthyr Town F.C. players
Dundee F.C. players
Sunderland A.F.C. players
Swindon Town F.C. players
Worcester City F.C. players
Shrewsbury Town F.C. players
Brierley Hill Alliance F.C. players
Dudley Town F.C. players
Hednesford Town F.C. players
Cannock Town F.C. players
Nuneaton Borough F.C. players
Bournville Athletic F.C. players
English Football League players